Yusniel Efraín Díaz Hechavarría (born October 7, 1996) is a Cuban professional baseball outfielder in the Los Angeles Dodgers organization. He has played in Major League Baseball (MLB) for the Baltimore Orioles.

Career

Industriales
Díaz played for the Industriales of the Cuban National Series and hit .348/.448/.440 over 65 games as a rookie. He was the favorite to win the Cuban National Series Rookie of the Year Award, but defected before the award was given out.

Los Angeles Dodgers
Díaz signed with the Los Angeles Dodgers in November 2015. The Dodgers assigned him to the Rancho Cucamonga Quakes of the Advanced Class-A California League to begin his professional career. In 82 games for the Quakes in 2016, he hit .267 with eight homers and 54 RBI. In 2017, he played in 83 games for the Quakes and 31 for the Double-A Tulsa Drillers and  hit .292 with 11 homers and 52 RBI. He was assigned to play in the Arizona Fall League and was chosen for the Fall Stars Game showcase. Díaz remained with Tulsa to begin 2018 and was selected to the "world" team at the All-Star Futures Game.

Baltimore Orioles
On July 18, 2018, Díaz was traded to the Baltimore Orioles along with Breyvic Valera, Dean Kremer, Rylan Bannon, and Zach Pop in exchange for Manny Machado. He was assigned to the Bowie Baysox and finished the year there. In 97 games between Tulsa and Bowie, he slashed .285/.392/.449 with 11 home runs and 45 RBIs. He split the 2019 season between the Aberdeen IronBirds, Frederick Keys, and Bowie, hitting a combined .265/.341/.464/.805 with 11 home runs and 55 RBI. Díaz did not play in a game in 2020 due to the cancellation of the minor league season because of the COVID-19 pandemic.

On November 20, 2020, Díaz was added to the 40-man roster. Díaz split the 2021 season between Bowie and the Triple-A Norfolk Tides. In 65 games between the two affiliates, he batted .161/.233/.265 with 5 home runs and 22 RBI. 

He spent the majority of the 2022 season with Norfolk, slashing .251/.346/.360 with 6 home runs, 34 RBI, and 9 stolen bases in 70 games. On August 1, 2022, Díaz was recalled and promoted to the major leagues for the first time. He made his MLB debut the next day, receiving one plate appearance and striking out against the Texas Rangers’ Dennis Santana. He was sent down to Norfolk to the following day. He was recalled on August 21, but sent down the next day without making an appearance.

On November 10, 2022, Díaz was removed from the 40-man roster and sent outright to Norfolk. He elected free agency on November 11.

Los Angeles Dodgers (second stint)
On February 3, 2023, Díaz signed a minor league contract with the Los Angeles Dodgers organization.

References

External Links 

1996 births
Living people
Aberdeen IronBirds players
Arizona League Dodgers players
Baltimore Orioles players
Bowie Baysox players
Cuban expatriate baseball players in the Dominican Republic
Defecting Cuban baseball players
Florida Complex League Orioles players
Frederick Keys players
Glendale Desert Dogs players
Industriales de La Habana players
Leones del Escogido players
Major League Baseball outfielders
Major League Baseball players from Cuba
Mesa Solar Sox players
Norfolk Tides players
Rancho Cucamonga Quakes players
Baseball players from Havana
Tulsa Drillers players